The 2015 Nigerian Senate election in Bauchi State was held on March 28, 2015, to elect members of the Nigerian Senate to represent Bauchi State. Isah Hamma representing Bauchi Central, Malam Wakili representing Bauchi South and Sulaiman Mohammed Nazif representing Bauchi North all won on the platform of All Progressives Congress.

Overview

Summary

Results

Bauchi Central 
All Progressives Congress candidate Isah Hamma won the election, defeating People's Democratic Party candidate Abdul Ahmed Ningi and other party candidates.

Bauchi South 
All Progressives Congress candidate Malam Wakili won the election, defeating People's Democratic Party candidate Isa Yuguda and other party candidates.

Bauchi North 
All Progressives Congress candidate Sulaiman Mohammed Nazif won the election, defeating People's Democratic Party candidate Farouk Mustapha and other party candidates.

References 

Bauchi State Senate elections
Senate elections in Bauchi State
Bauchi State Senate